Incident at Victoria Falls (also known as Sherlock Holmes and the Incident at Victoria Falls and Sherlock Holmes: The Star of Africa) is the 1992 sequel to Sherlock Holmes and the Leading Lady, and the second and final film in the proposed series of television films Sherlock Holmes the Golden Years written by Bob Shayne. It starred Christopher Lee and Patrick Macnee as Holmes and Watson in old age.

Plot
In the film, Holmes is about to retire to Sussex and keep bees when King Edward (Joss Ackland) sends him on a mission to South Africa to retrieve the Star of Africa diamond. Complications arise and Holmes meets several historical people including ex-President Theodore Roosevelt (Claude Akins), and Lillie Langtry (Jenny Seagrove). He also encounters the fictional character A. J. Raffles.

Cast
 Christopher Lee as Sherlock Holmes
 Patrick Macnee as Dr. John Watson
 Jenny Seagrove as Lillie Langtry
 Joss Ackland as King Edward
 Richard Todd as Lord Roberts
 Claude Akins as Theodore Roosevelt
 Margaret John as Mrs. Hudson
 Jerome Willis as Mycroft Holmes
 Alan Coates as Stanley I. Bullard / A. J. Raffles

References

External links
 
 VideoVista review

Sherlock Holmes films
1992 television films
1992 films
Films directed by Bill Corcoran
1990s mystery films
Films about Theodore Roosevelt
Cultural depictions of Edward VII
1990s American films